The Junkers G.38 was a large German four-engined transport aircraft which first flew in 1929. Two examples were constructed in Germany. Both aircraft flew as a commercial transport within Europe in the years leading up to World War II.

During the 1930s, the design was licensed to Mitsubishi, which constructed and flew a total of six aircraft, in a military bomber/transport configuration, designated Ki-20.

The G.38 carried a crew of seven. Onboard mechanics were able to service the engines in flight due to the G.38's blended wing design, which provided access to all four power plants.

Design and development

During the 1920s, Hugo Junkers made several attempts to produce a large scale commercial transport. His initial attempt, the four-engined JG1, was developed during 1921-1922; but Junkers was forced to destroy the incomplete airplane based on post-WWI Allied demands citing the Treaty of Versailles.  Later in the decade, in 1925, he published design specifications for a proposed eighty passenger trans-Atlantic aircraft - the J.1000 project. Then again, towards the end of the decade, the G.40 project was started by the Junkers design team as a trans-Atlantic mail plane.  From the G.40 design, which was a seaplane configuration, Junkers also developed a landplane design, designated the G.38.  Despite interest from the German armed forces in the G.40 variant, Junkers pushed forward with the landplane design which, having received financing from the Reich Air Ministry (Reichsluftfahrtministerium), was taken forward to the construction stage.

The first Junkers prototype—3301 and marked as D-2000—first flew on 6 November 1929 with four diesel engines: two Junkers L55 V-12 engines and two 294 kW L8 inline-6 engines, with a total power rating of 1470 kW (1971 hp). The Reich Air Ministry purchased the D-2000 for demonstration flights, and took delivery on 27 March 1930. In flight tests, the G.38 set four world records including speed, distance and duration for airplanes lifting a 5000 kg payload. On 2 May 1930 Luft Hansa put the D-2000 into commercial service for both scheduled and chartered flights.

Structurally the G.38 conformed to standard Junkers' practice, with a multi-tubular spar cantilever wing covered (like the rest of the aircraft) in stressed, corrugated duraluminium. The biplane tail, found in other large aircraft of the time, was intended to reduce rudder forces; initially there were three rudders with only a central fixed fin. The undercarriage was fixed, with double tandem main wheels that were initially enclosed in very large spats. The wing had the usual Junkers "double wing" form, the name referring to the full span movable flaps which served also as ailerons in the outer part.

On 2 February 1931 the Leipzig-based Junkers' yard re-engined the D-2000 with two Junkers L8 and two L88 engines, giving a total power rating of 1764 kW (2366 hp) and increasing passenger capacity from 13 to 19.

During its early life the G.38 was the largest landplane in the world. Passenger accommodation was sumptuous by today's standards and was meant to rival that found on the competing Zeppelin service offered by DELAG. The plane was unique in that passengers were seated in the wings, which were 1.7 m (5 ft 7 in) thick at the root.  There were also two seats in the extreme nose. The leading edge of each wing was fitted with sloping windscreens giving these passengers the forward-facing view usually available only to pilots. There were three 11-seat cabins, plus smoking cabins and washrooms.

In design terms the G-38 followed the Blended Wing Body design pioneered by Louis de Monge, later followed by Vincent Burnelli in his UB14 and later CBY-3 designs, and even later considered by both NASA and Boeing as an alternative to traditional tube and wing aircraft configurations.

Operational history
On 1 July 1931 Luft Hansa initiated regularly scheduled service between Berlin and London on flights carrying up to 13 passengers. This London-Berlin service was halted in October 1931 to retrofit the aircraft and expand the passenger cabin of the D-2000. Construction lasted from this time until mid-1932, during which a second deck was built within the D-2000's fuselage—enabling an increased cargo capacity and seating for up to 30 passengers. Additionally the D-2000's engines were again upgraded to four L88s, giving a total power of 2352 kW (3154 hp). Also at this time the D-2000's registration was changed to D-AZUR.

Meanwhile, a second G.38—factory number 3302 and c/n D-2500, later changed to D-APIS—was built with a double deck fuselage and capacity for 34 passengers. Six passengers were carried three per wing in each leading edge, the remaining 22 on two levels in the fuselage. Luft Hansa used D-APIS on a scheduled service covering the cities Berlin, Hanover, Amsterdam, and London. This aircraft was named General Feldmarschall von Hindenburg.

In 1934 D-2000/D-AZUR had its engines upgraded, this time with Jumo 4 engines, giving a total power rating of 2208 kW (2960 hp).

Both planes were in service simultaneously until 1936, when D-AZUR crashed in Dessau during a post-maintenance test flight. Luft Hansa had to write off this aircraft due to the extensive damage, but test pilot Wilhelm Zimmermann survived the crash, and there were no other casualties.

The second G.38—marked D-2500 and later D-APIS—flew successfully within the Deutsche Luft Hansa fleet for nearly a decade. With the outbreak of World War II the D-2500/D-APIS was pressed into military service as a transport craft by the Luftwaffe. It was destroyed on the ground during an RAF air raid on Athens on 17 May 1941.

Specifications (G.38 1929)

{{Aircraft specs
|ref=
|prime units?=met

|crew=7
|capacity=30 (D-2000/D-AZUR) and 34 (D-2500/D-APIS) passengers
|length m=23.21
|length ft=
|length in=
|length note=
|span m=44
|span ft=
|span in=
|span note=
|upper span m=
|upper span ft=
|upper span in=
|upper span note=
|mid span m=
|mid span ft=
|mid span in=
|mid span note=
|lower span m=
|lower span ft=
|lower span in=
|lower span note=
|swept m=
|swept ft=
|swept in=
|swept note=
|dia m=
|dia ft=
|dia in=
|dia note=
|width m=
|width ft=
|width in=
|width note=
|height m=7.2
|height ft=
|height in=
|height note=
|wing area sqm=290
|wing area sqft=
|wing area note=
|swept area sqm=
|swept area sqft=
|swept area note=
|volume m3=
|volume ft3=
|volume note=
|aspect ratio=
|airfoil=
|empty weight kg=14,920
|empty weight lb=
|empty weight note=
|gross weight kg=24,000
|gross weight lb=
|gross weight note=
|max takeoff weight kg=21,240
|max takeoff weight lb=
|max takeoff weight note=
|fuel capacity=
|lift kg=
|lift lb=
|lift note=
|more general=

|eng1 number=2
|eng1 name=Junkers L88
|eng1 type=V-12 water-cooled Diesel piston engines
|eng1 kw=
|eng1 hp=
|eng1 shp=
|eng1 kn=
|eng1 lbf=
|eng1 note= inboard
|power original=
|thrust original=
|eng1 kn-ab=
|eng1 lbf-ab=

|eng2 number=2
|eng2 name=Junkers L8a
|eng2 type= six-cylinder, water-cooled, in-line Diesel piston engines
|eng2 kw=
|eng2 hp=413
|eng2 shp=
|eng2 kn=
|eng2 lbf=
|eng2 note= at take-off, outboard
|eng2 kn-ab=
|eng2 lbf-ab=

|prop blade number=2
|prop name=wooden fixed pitch propellers outboard, 4-bladed wooden fixed pitch propellers inboard
|prop dia m=
|prop dia ft=
|prop dia in=
|prop dia note=

|rot number=
|rot dia m=
|rot dia ft=
|rot dia in=
|rot area sqm=
|rot area sqft=
|rot area note=

|perfhide=

|max speed kmh=225
|max speed mph=
|max speed kts=
|max speed note=<ref name = "T&N">Turner, P. St.J, & Nowarra, H. Junkers: an aircraft album (1971). New York:Arco Publishing Inc</ref>
|max speed mach=
|cruise speed kmh=175
|cruise speed mph=
|cruise speed kts=
|cruise speed note=
|stall speed kmh=
|stall speed mph=
|stall speed kts=
|stall speed note=
|never exceed speed kmh=
|never exceed speed mph=
|never exceed speed kts=
|never exceed speed note=
|minimum control speed kmh=
|minimum control speed mph=
|minimum control speed kts=
|minimum control speed note=
|range km=3,460
|range miles=
|range nmi=
|range note=
|combat range km=
|combat range miles=
|combat range nmi=
|combat range note=
|ferry range km=
|ferry range miles=
|ferry range nmi=
|ferry range note=
|endurance=
|ceiling m=3,690
|ceiling ft=
|ceiling note=
|g limits=
|roll rate=
|glide ratio=
|climb rate ms=
|climb rate ftmin=
|climb rate note=
|time to altitude=
|sink rate ms=
|sink rate ftmin=
|sink rate note=
|lift to drag=
|wing loading kg/m2=
|wing loading lb/sqft=
|wing loading note=
|disk loading kg/m2=
|disk loading lb/sqft=
|disk loading note=
|fuel consumption kg/km=
|fuel consumption lb/mi=
|power/mass=
|thrust/weight=

|more performance=

|armament=
|guns= 
|bombs= 
|rockets= 
|missiles= 
|hardpoints=
|hardpoint capacity=
|hardpoint rockets=
|hardpoint missiles=
|hardpoint bombs=
|hardpoint other=

|avionics=
}}

Operators

 Deutsche Luft Hansa 
 Luftwaffe In popular culture 
The G.38 was featured in the 2013 semi-fictional movie ''The Wind Rises'' by Japanese director Hayao Miyazaki, as was Hugo Junkers.

See also

References

Notes

Bibliography

 
 
 Junkers-G38  junkers.de (German)
 G38 Special: Fliegendes Hotel: Die Junkers G 38 junkers.de (German)

 External links 

 Movie of the first test flight of the G38 D-2000
 "Huge Plane Carries Passengers In Wings" Popular Mechanics'', February 1930
 
 "Huge Plane Takes Crew Under Its Wing", January 1931, Popular Mechanics article includes photo and cutaway drawing
 "Giant Of The Air - The Latest German Liner", January 1933, Popular Mechanics cutaway drawing of G.38 better than 1931 article
 Photo of D-APIS in Greece in 1941

1930s German airliners
World War II transport aircraft of Germany
G.38
Four-engined tractor aircraft
Aircraft first flown in 1929
Four-engined piston aircraft